Parliamentary elections were held in Colombia on 14 March 1982 to elect the Senate and Chamber of Representatives. The result was a victory for the Liberal Party, which won 104 of the 199 Chamber seats and 55 of the 114 Senate seats.

The Liberal Party had split shortly before the elections, with a breakaway faction forming New Liberalism.

This election is notable for including the election of Pablo Escobar as a congressman.

Results

Senate

Chamber of Representatives
Notorious drug lord Pablo Escobar was elected as an alternative member of the Chamber of Representatives as part of the Liberal Party, later joining the Liberal Alternative faction.

References

Parliamentary elections in Colombia
Colombia
1982 in Colombia
Election and referendum articles with incomplete results